This is a list of heads of state of Cabinda.

A short-lived secessionist regime in the Cabinda enclave of Angola.

(Dates in italics indicate de facto continuation of office)

Note: The current president of the Republic of Cabinda in Exile is General of Army Antonio Luis Lopes

Affiliations

Sources 
 https://web.archive.org/web/20120411232707/http://www.cabindanation.net/
 http://www.rulers.org/rula1.html#algeria
 http://www.portalestoria.net/ANGOLA.htm
http://www.globalsecurity.org/military/world/para/flec.htm
 Heads of State and Government, 2nd Edition, John V da Graca, MacMillan Press 2000

See also 
Angola
Heads of government of Cabinda
Heads of state of Angola
Heads of government of Angola
Prime Minister of Angola
President of Angola
Colonial heads of Angola
Lists of office-holders
List of colonial and provincial heads of Cabinda

Republic of Cabinda
Heads of state of former unrecognized countries